József Ángyán (born 18 September 1965) is a Hungarian sports shooter. He competed in the men's 10 metre running target event at the 2000 Summer Olympics.

References

1965 births
Living people
Hungarian male sport shooters
Olympic shooters of Hungary
Shooters at the 2000 Summer Olympics
Sportspeople from Keszthely